Mitchellsburg is an unincorporated community in Boyle County, Kentucky, United States. Mitchellsburg had a post office until April 12, 2008; it still has its own ZIP code, 40452.

References

Unincorporated communities in Boyle County, Kentucky
Unincorporated communities in Kentucky